Carrier Strike Group Ten was involved in a number of operations between 2004–2009. Carrier Strike Group Ten was a U.S. Navy carrier strike group. In 2004–09 it was based at Naval Station Norfolk. In those five years it made two Middle East providing air and naval support for the War in Iraq and the War in Afghanistan, as well as Operation Vigilant Resolve, and Joint Task Force Exercise 05-2 (JTFEX 05-2).
In 2004–09 the group's flagship was the Nimitz-class nuclear-powered aircraft carrier .

2004–2006 Operations

2004 Mediterranean deployment
The strike group departed Norfolk on 13 October 2004 for an extended deployment under the command of Rear Admiral Michael C. Tracy. The strike group participates in the Joint Maritime Course (JMC-043) north of Scotland between 25–28 October 2004.  JMC-043 included strike, surface, and submarine warfare exercises with a multi-national force. CARSTRKGRU 10 subsequently paid by a port visit to Souda Bay, Crete, between 5–8 November 2004. Despite plans to cross the equator and visited South Africa, diplomatic issues caused the strike group to transit the Suez Canal, stopping in Portsmouth, England, prior to returning to the United States on 19 April 2005.

Force composition

Fifth Fleet operations
Carrier Strike Group Ten transited the Suez Canal on 11 November 2004 and relieved the  carrier strike group on 20 November 2004.  Truman and Carrier Air Wing 3 launched 2,577 sorties, totaling nearly 13,000 flight hours, in support of Iraq and maritime security operations (MSO) before being relieved by the  Carrier Strike Group in the Persian Gulf on 19 March 2005. One major air operation involved a VAW-126 detachment of two E-2C Hawkeyes that operated out of Kandahar Air Base, Afghanistan, from 4–13 December 2004.  The detachment's mission was to provide airborne command and control for the inauguration of Hamid Karzai, Afghanistan's first democratically elected president.  This event was attended by an entourage led by U.S. Vice President Richard B. Cheney and Secretary of Defense Donald H. Rumsfeld.

Exercises & port visits

Joint Task Force Exercise 05-2 (JTFEX 05-2), Operation Brewing Storm
The aircraft carrier  Harry S. Truman was reassigned at the flagship for Carrier Strike Group Ten, and the Theodore Roosevelt was reassigned at the flagship for Carrier Strike Group Two.

The group then participated in Joint Task Force Exercise 05-2 (JTFEX 05-2), Operation Brewing Storm, between 14–22 July 2005. Brewing Storm presented U.S. and coalition forces with realistic and dynamic exercise threats that closely replicated operational challenges forces routinely encounter around the world. It was designed to provide quality, realistic training to prepare U.S. forces for joint and combined operations. Truman (CVN-75) and Carrier Air Wing 3 (CVW-3) also completed sustainment training 19 July under the U.S. Navy's Fleet Response Training Plan (FRTP) during Commander, U.S. 2nd Fleet's Joint Task Force Exercise (JTFEX 05-2), which included general quarters drills, strike warfare, close air support, and air defense.

USS Harry S. Truman maintenance cycle
USS Harry S. Truman (CVN-74) entered the Norfolk Naval Shipyard for a Docked Planned Incremental Availability overhaul in January 2006. The ship received many system upgrades, and underwent preventative maintenance to repair minor weld defects originating from the initial construction of the reactor plants. On 4 August 2006, the Truman left dry-dock and transited to Norfolk Naval Shipyard's Pier 5 to complete the last stages of its DPIA and continued preparations for its surge beginning in April 2007.

2007–2009 Operations

2007–2008 MED deployment
Following humanitarian assistance and disaster response operation in the aftermath of Hurricane Katrina in September 2005, the Truman underwent an extended yard period at the Norfolk Naval Shipyard in Portsmouth, Virginia. On 5 November 2007, following the yard period and training exercises, Carrier Strike Group 10 departed Norfolk under the command Rear Admiral William E. Gortneyfor an extended deployment to the U.S. Fifth Fleet's area of responsibility (AOR). Carrier Strike Group 10 completed its seven-month overseas deployment, returning to Norfolk on 6 June 2008. The task group supported maritime security operations in the Mediterranean Sea and Persian Gulf as well as provided close air support for ground forces serving in Operation Iraqi Freedom.

Force composition

Carrier air operations

Carrier Air Wing 3 (CVW-3) aircraft flew more than 26,500 hours during 9,500 sorties, including 2,459 combat sorties directly in support of coalition forces operating on the ground in Iraq.  CVW-3 flew almost 14,000 combat hours and expended 77,500 pounds of ordnance during 228 troops-in-contact events, as well as providing defense to the Iraqi oil platforms.  Additionally, the carrier air wing provided logistical support to the American Embassy in Lebanon.  CVW-3 aircraft also carried out a variety of security cooperation exercises with five countries within the Sixth Fleet and Fifth Fleet areas of responsibilities to enhance allied cooperation and interoperability.

Maritime security operations
Surface warships of Destroyer Squadron 26 (DESRON-26) operated with over 50 coalition warships from 11 countries supporting combat operations in Iraq, carrying Maritime Security Operations (MSO) in the Persian Gulf, and conducting seven exercises throughout the Middle East.  DESRON-26 warships made 1,021 approach-and-assist visits with local fishermen and merchants to encourage them to contact coalition warships as first responders against Persian Gulf piracy and smuggling.  They also conducted visit, board, search, and seizures (VBSS) operations, searching for vessels that could support international terrorist organizations by transferring personnel, drugs, and weapons.  Finally, DESRON-26 warships provided security patrols northern Persian Gulf to protect the vital Khor Al-Amaya and Al-Basra oil terminals from possible terrorist attacks.

USS Harry S. Truman maintenance cycle
USS Truman (CVN-75) completed sea trials following its nearly seven-month Planned Incremental Availability (PIA) at the Norfolk Naval Shipyard in Portsmouth, Virginia, on 14 February 2009. On 5 August 2009, EA-18G Growlers from Electronic Attack Squadron 129 (VAQ-129) and Electronic Attack Squadron 132 (VAQ-132) completed their first at-sea carrier-arrested landing (trap) aboard Harry S. Truman.

Notes

References

External links
 Carrier Strike Group Ten Official Website
 USS Harry S. Truman (CVN-75) Story Archive – U.S. Navy
 USS Harry S. Truman (CVN-75) – U.S. Navy

United States Navy in the 21st century